Liga ASOBAL 1993–94 season was the fourth since its establishment. The league was played in a two phases. In the first phase, a total of 16 teams were separate in two groups of eight teams. The first four of every groups passed to the second phase for the title. The last four passed to the second phase for the permanence in Liga ASOBAL.

First phase

Group A

Group B

Second phase

Group I

Championship playoffs

Group II

In–Out promotion

1st leg

2nd leg

Guadalajara & Atl. Madrid Alcobendas remained in Liga ASOBAL.
Later, Atl. Madrid Alcobendas was dissolved and Academia Octavio maintained its seat.

Top goal scorers

References

1993-94
handball
handball
Spain